Kitasatospora albolonga is a bacterium species from the genus Kitasatospora. Kitasatospora albolonga produces valilactone, ansathiazin, awamycin and griseofulvin.

References

Further reading

External links
Type strain of Streptomyces albolongus at BacDive -  the Bacterial Diversity Metadatabase

Streptomycineae
Bacteria described in 1964